In some countries, an academy professor is a scientist appointed to function as professor and/or conferred to the official professor rank by the academy of sciences of that country, rather than by any university establishment.

Such scientists are seen to exceed the ordinary university professors in research qualification and are elected on a competitive basis. The academy professors have an employment relationship with the organizations where their research posts are located. Such academy professors exist in Finland, Russia and Kazakhstan. Some academies, such as the Chinese Academy of Sciences, may also award the honorary academy professor titles.

Finland 
In Finland, the academy professors are assigned by the Academy of Finland. Presently there are 25 scientists in this status. Among these, there are, for example, an ecologist Johanna Mappes and a specialist in computational nanoscience Hannu Häkkinen. The service duration is five years.

In order to be considered for an Academy Professorship, applicants must have demonstrated their skills and competencies in research and be regarded as contributing to the progress of research within their own field. Research posts as Academy Professor presumes a full-time research work where the professors carry out their own research plan, supervise their research team and provide guidance to junior researchers. Their duties also include supervision of thesis and dissertation writers in their own field and teaching related to their research.

Russia 
Two Russian national academies – the Russian Academy of Sciences (RAS) and the Russian Academy of Education (RAE) award the honorary professor ranks to the Russian scientists aged under 50. The election is based on scientific achievements. The titles are either "RAS Professor", with 715 holders as of end-May 2022, or "RAE Professor", respectively. Along with a current work at their institutions, these professors are expected to take part in the strategic planning of scientific politics in Russia at different levels; they are also treated as possible candidates for membership in the Academy in the future.

The professor titles are also introduced in several non-state academies, like, e.g. the Russian Academy of Natural Sciences (s. sample certificate), but reputation of such academies is doubtful and their titles are not considered seriously.

Other countries 
Like in Russia, some public academies in Kazakhstan, e.g. the Regional Academy of Management (s. list of professors), confer the professor titles. Furthermore, there is a position named "academical professor" (equivalent to a usual professor position) in that country having nothing common with any academies of sciences.

The Chinese Academy of Sciences (CAS) award the honor titles of Einstein professor of the CAS to outstanding foreign scientists. In China, there is also the University of the CAS which is working under the auspices of the Academy; the faculty of this university involves over 250 members of the CAS who are sometimes called "Professors of the Academy".

References 

Academic ranks
Science and technology in Finland
Science and technology in Russia
Science and technology in China